The 1991–92 Belgian Hockey League season was the 72nd season of the Belgian Hockey League, the top level of ice hockey in Belgium. Five teams participated in the league, and Olympia Heist op den Berg won the championship.

Regular season

Playoffs

Semifinals
Brussels Tigers - Griffoens Geel 3-3, 4-5
Olympia Heist op den Berg - Herentals IJC 4-3, 8-1

Final
Olympia Heist op den Berg - Griffoens Geel 6-5 (OT), 5-4 (OT)

3rd place
Herentals IJC - Brussels Tigers 9-8 (OT)

External links
Season on hockeyarchives.info

Belgian Hockey League
Belgian Hockey League seasons
Bel